David Bark-Jones is an English actor. He has appeared in numerous film, theatre and TV productions, he won Broadwayworld.com's Best Actor in a West End Play 2010, for his portrayal of Richard Hannay in The 39 Steps.

He has two sons with wife Rachel, Ted and Fergus Bark-Jones.

Early life
David is the son of a surgeon and a JP. He attended Rugby School and Newcastle University where he read Politics and Ancient History. He also attended Mountview Academy of Theatre Arts where he was taught the Stanislavski System of acting by Sam Kogan.  After graduating and whilst working professionally, he continued to study directing under Kogan at The School of the Science of Acting (now known as The Kogan Academy of Dramatic Arts) as Kogan developed 'The Science of Acting' acting technique.

Career
His professional stage debut in 1992 was as Redpenny in The Doctor's Dilemma at the Manchester Royal Exchange, a role believed to be based on Bark-Jones's Great Great Uncle, Leonard Noon the co-discoverer of Allergen immunotherapy.  He then appeared in various repertory and TV productions in small roles until playing Carl in Patrick Marber's first and improvised play, Dealer's Choice at the Royal National Theatre and in the West End of London, Lt Denny in the "Colin Firth" BBC Pride and Prejudice, Bulanov in Alan Ayckbourn's The Forest adaptation also at the National Theatre, Bertie in Guy Richie's RocknRolla, Dr Losberne in Alan Bleasdale's TV adaptation of Oliver Twist opposite Keira Knightley, Francis in Scott Free's Pillars of the Earth, and Marty Braemer in The Weinstein Company RADiUS division, Erased, or as known worldwide, The Expatriate.  In 2013 Bark-Jones toured the UK in The Old Vic production of Noises Off as Gary Lejeune.

Filmography

References

External links

David happy to play fall guy in Noises Off
The Academy of the Science of Acting
Starvecrow

1966 births
Living people
Male actors from Merseyside
People educated at Rugby School
Alumni of Newcastle University
Alumni of the Mountview Academy of Theatre Arts
English male television actors